Hermuthruda, Hermutrude (Old English: Eormenthryth) was a figure in Scandinavian romance.

The chief authority for the legend of Hermuthruda is the Danish chronicle Gesta Danorum by Saxo Grammaticus. Described as "the wild queen of Scotland", she became the wife of Wihtlaeg or Vigletus and is described as a Wicked Queen type of character such as found in a variety of fiction.

In the chronicle, Amlethus is sent to court Hermuthruda by the King of England. However the queen had a reputation for killing all suitors, Saxo saying "in the cruelty of her arrogance she had always loathed her wooers, and inflicted upon them the supreme punishment, so that out of many there was not one but paid for his boldness with his head". Hermuthruda takes a liking to Amlethus after stealing his shield and learning of his past. The couple are married until a battle with Wihtlaeg, before which Hermuthruda promises Amlethus her undying love for him, and that she will never marry another. After Wihtlaeg is victorious, Hermuthruda switches sides and immediately marries him in a display of inconsistency that leads to her becoming the "ancestress of Offa".

See also
Queen of Elphame

References

Mythological queens
Legendary Danish people
Amleth
Scottish folklore